Christmas 25th Anniversary Collection is a compilation album by Mannheim Steamroller. It is the group's eleventh Christmas album overall. It was released in 2009 as a double CD by American Gramaphone, and features 25 Christmas songs.  It contains songs from their Mannheim Steamroller Christmas (1984), A Fresh Aire Christmas (1988), Christmas in the Aire (1995), My Little Christmas Tree (1997), The Christmas Angel: A Family Story (1998), Christmas Extraordinaire (2001), Christmas Song (2007) and Christmasville (2008).

Track listing

CD 1
 "Faeries" [from The Nutcracker]
 "Gagliarda"
 "My Little Christmas Tree"
 "We Three Kings"
 "Joseph Dear, Oh Joseph Mine"
 "It Came Upon the Midnight Clear"
 "Have Yourself a Merry Little Christmas"
 "Joy to the World"
 "First Noel"
 "Pat a Pan"
 "Let It Snow, Let It Snow, Let It Snow"
 "Cantique de Noël" ("O Holy Night")

CD 2
 "Traditions of Christmas (Music Box)"
 "Messengers of Christmas"
 "Lo, How a Rose E'er Blooming"
 "Winter Wonderland"
 "The Christmas Song"
 "Hark! The Herald Trumpets Sing"
 "Hark! The Herald Angels Sing"
 "Above the Northern Lights"
 "Jingle Bells"
 "The Holly and the Ivy"
 "The Little Drummer Boy"
 "Still, Still, Still"
 "O' Little Town of Bethlehem"

Musicians

References

Mannheim Steamroller Christmas 25th Anniversary Collection compact disc on Amazon.com 
Album entry on Mannheim Steamroller's shop

2009 Christmas albums
Christmas albums by American artists
Mannheim Steamroller albums
American Gramaphone compilation albums
Classical Christmas albums
New-age Christmas albums
American Gramaphone Christmas albums
Christmas compilation albums